Captain Josephine Okwuekeleke Tolefe (born December 15, 1931 in Aniocha, Delta State, Nigeria) was the first female commissioned officer in the Nigerian Army. She was the first female military officer and the first female to attain the rank of an Army Captain in Nigeria.

Personal life and educational background
She was born on the 15th of December, 1931 in Ogwashi-Ukwu, the southern part of Aniocha in Delta State, Nigeria. She attended Midwives Training College, High Coombe Surrey, United Kingdom to study Nursing and graduated as a registered nurse under the General Nursing Council for England and Wales in August, 1956.

Career
Josephine was a professional nurse but she decided to join the Nigerian Army because she was impressed by the look of the women in the British Army and the way they defended their country. After joining the Army, she was appointed as Second Lieutenant in 1961. Two years after, she was appointed Army Captain.

Although Josephine was celebrated, but she and her female colleagues faced many challenges as regards to their gender. She retired voluntarily from service on 5 February 1967 and passed on in 2014.

References

1931 births
Nigerian Army officers
2014 deaths
People from Delta State
Nigerian female military personnel